Staniforth is an English surname, a variation of the name "Stanford". Old English surnames were in particular a description of one's profession such as "Smith" or "Thatcher" or described an area in which one lived.  

The name of Stanford is believed to be of ancient Saxon origin and to have been derived from the words stan, meaning "stone", and ford, meaning "river-crossing". It was undoubtedly first given to a place answering that description (there were ten parishes of the name in England) and was taken therefrom by its first bearer because of his residence there at the time of the adoption of surnames in Great Britain. Sheffield historian David Hey writes about a potential location on the Blackburn Brook in Ecclesfield that contained a farm known as Stonyford Farm. The 1434 Ecclesfield court rolls mention John of Stannyford passing on land in 'Stanyford' to his son Richard further backs up this claim. It is found in ancient records in the various spellings of Staniford, Staniforth, Stanforth, Stamforth, Standiford, Stanniford, Staynfor, Stanforde, Stannyforthe, Standford and Stanford, of which the form last mentioned is that most generally used in North America today.

Among the early records of the family in England are those of Adam de Stanford, of Oxford County in 1273.  Probably the first of the name in America were Richard and John Stanford of Virginia in 1635.  

The Staniforth spelling in particular appears to be concentrated in Yorkshire. Many of the same spelling emigrated to Canada and America in the early-to-middle 19th century.

People named Staniforth include:
Allan Staniforth, engineer and racecar engineer
Archer Christopher Staniforth, footballer
Charles Staniforth Hext, Military captain
David Staniforth (field hockey), hockey player
David Staniforth (footballer) (born 1950), English footballer
Edwin Wilfred Stanyforth, British Army Commander
Gordon Staniforth, footballer
Joseph Morewood Staniforth, editorial cartoonist
Michael Staniforth, actor
John Staniforth, politician
John William Staniforth, writer
Scott Staniforth, rugby player
Tom Staniforth, rugby player
Thomas Staniforth, English priest
Fred Staniforth, footballer
Thomas Staniforth, Lord Mayor of Liverpool
Thomas Worsley Staniforth, Hymn composer
Samuel Staniforth, Lord Mayor of Liverpool (son of the above)
R. T. Stanyforth, England Test Cricket captain
Reverend Oswald Staniforth, English author and Franciscan friar
Ron Staniforth, footballer
Thomas Staniforth, founder and namesake of Thomas Staniforth & Co Scytheworks
Miles Staniforth Cater Smith, Australian politician 
Alex Staniforth, Adventurer
Lucy Staniforth, footballer
Graydon Staniforth, Australian rugby player
Maxwell Staniforth, Soldier and Clergyman
Nate Staniforth, American magician and author
Staniforth Ricketson, Australian stockbroker
William Staniforth, 18th Century Surgeon
William Thomas Staniforth, founder of the Ascend Cutlery Works

Places
Staniforth Road, Sheffield, England
Staniforth Range, Papua New Guinea

Other
Hoole, Staniforth and Co

External links
The Staniforth Society - genealogical organisation

English-language surnames